Pond Meadow Park is a  multi use park located between the towns of Braintree and Weymouth in Massachusetts. It has a  pond and dam that provide floodplain protection to the nearby Weymouth Landing Area. The park also acts as a recreation and conservation area, with a picnic area, camp ground, and walking and bike trails.  It was officially opened in 1976 and is run under the Weymouth Braintree Regional Recreation Conservation District.

References 

1976 establishments in Massachusetts
Geography of Braintree, Massachusetts
Parks in Norfolk County, Massachusetts
Protected areas established in 1976
Weymouth, Massachusetts